The nimble-footed mouse (Peromyscus levipes) is a species of rodent in the family Cricetidae. It is found only in Mexico.

Description
The nimble-footed mouse has a typical mouse-like appearance, and closely resembles other members of the Peromyscus boylii species group, from some of which it can only be distinguished by genetic analysis. It has tawny or buff fur over most of the body, with dusky hairs and white or creamy-white under parts. There is a ring of darker fur around the eyes, and sometimes on the muzzle, and often a faint blackish line down the middle of the back.

Distribution and habitat
The nimble-footed mouse is found only in Mexico, where it inhabits the Sierra Madre Oriental mountains from Nuevo León in the north to Puebla in the south. It inhabits rocky areas such as bluffs and creeks within forests dominated by oak, pine, juniper, or sweet gum, as well as within cloud forests.

Two subspecies are currently recognised:
 P. l. levipes - majority of range
 P. l. ambiguus - Neuvo León and western Tamaulipas

Biology
Known predators include barn owls and mottled owls. They breed two or three times a year, probably without any distinct breeding season.

References

Peromyscus
Mammals described in 1898
Taxonomy articles created by Polbot
Taxa named by Clinton Hart Merriam
Endemic mammals of Mexico
Fauna of the Sierra Madre Oriental